The 2014 Cambridge City Council election took place on 22 May 2014 to elect members of Cambridge City Council in England. This was on the same day as other local elections and the European Union elections.

Results summary

Ward results

Abbey

This seat was gained by the Labour Party in a by-election in 2013 and is therefore shown as a hold.

Arbury

Castle

Cherry Hinton

Coleridge

East Chesterton

King's Hedges

Market

Newnham

Petersfield

Queen Edith's

Romsey

Trumpington

West Chesterton

By-elections

Queen's Edith

A by-election was called due to the resignation of the incumbent Labour Party councillor Sue Birtles.

References

2014 English local elections
2014
2010s in Cambridge